Essie is a given name and nickname/hypocorism usually used as a feminine name.

As a standalone name, Essie can be found in several languages, including Romance, Germanic, and Persian ones. In each case, the name means "star."

As a nickname, it is used as a short form of several names, including Esther, Estelle, Celeste, Leslie, Lesley, and Esmeralda.

In the United States, the name reached its greatest popularity in the 1890s, peaking as the 139th most popular name for girls born during that decade. By 2018, it was notable for being disproportionately used by Southerners and African Americans.

People

Women
 Essie Ackland (1896–1975), Australian singer
 Essie Coffey (1940–1998), Australian Muruwari woman, co-founder of the Western Aboriginal Legal Service
 Essie Davis (born 1970), Australian actress
 Essie Garrett (1947–2014), American ultramarathon runner and instructor
 Essie Jain, English indie singer-songwriter
 Essie Jenyns (1864–1920), Australian stage actress
 Essie Kelley (born 1957), American former middle-distance runner
 Essie Pinola Parrish (1902–1979), Native American spiritual leader and basket weaver
 Eslanda Goode Robeson, (1896–1965) wife and business manager of Paul Robeson
 Essie Wick Rowland (1871–1957), American socialite
 Essie Shevill (1908–1989), Australian cricketer
 Essie Summers (1912–1998), New Zealand author
 Essie Mae Washington-Williams (1925–2013), the oldest child of the late United States Senator Strom Thurmond
 Essie Weingarten (born 1949), founder of Essie Cosmetics, Ltd
 Essie Whitman (c. 1887 – 1963), one of the Whitman Sisters black vaudeville stars

Men
 Essie Hollis (born 1955), American retired basketball player
 Essie Sakhai, Iranian-born British expert on Persian carpets and oriental rugs

Fictional characters
 Essie Harrison, on the British medical drama series Holby City

References

Hypocorisms